Since the inception of the Chinese Super League, in 2004, 84 players have scored three goals (a hat-trick) or more in a single match. The first player to achieve the feat was Guo Hui, who scored three times for Liaoning in a 5–2 victory over Shanghai Shenhua.

Hat-tricks

Note: The results column shows the scorer's team score first. Teams in bold are home teams.

 4 Player scored 4 goals

Multiple hat-tricks

The following table lists the minimum number of hat-tricks scored by players who have scored two or more hat-tricks.

Players in bold  are still active in the Chinese Super League.

Hat-tricks by nationality
The following table lists the number of hat-tricks scored by players from a single nation.

Hat-tricks by clubs

The following table lists the rank of hat-tricks scored by clubs.

Clubs in bold  are still active in the Chinese Super League.

Clubs in italic  are defunct.

References

Chinese Super League records and statistics
Chinese Super League